The siege of Mandsaur was a siege laid by Rajput Confederacy forces under Rana Sanga against Gujarat Sultanate and Malwa Sultanate. The Sultan of Gujarat left Muhammadabad (modern day Champaner) and returned to his capital after Rana Sanga had returned to Mewar after his campaign in Gujarat. He was grieved to see his treasuries looted and his palace destroyed and began to think of avenging his defeat. He set about preparing a large army, doubled the pay of the soldiers, and gave them a year's salary in advance.

Background
At last in Muharrum H. 927, December A.D. 1520, the Sultan sent Malik Ayaz with an army of 100,000 cavalry, 100 elephants against Mewar. Another army, consisting of 20,000 horse and 20 elephants was sent under Qiwam-ulmulk to co-operate with Malik Ayaz. Both these armies marched to Modasa. While they were encamped there, the Sultan, according to the Tabqati Akbari, sent reinforcements under Taj Khan and Nizamul-mulk. The Sultans army ravaged Dungarpur and advanced towards Banswara.

Siege
After a skirmish between 200 horsemen under Shuja-ul-mulk and others, and some Rajputs in the hills, the Sultan's army advanced and invested the fort of Mandsaur in Malwa, then in the Maharana's possession. The governor of the fort, Ashok Mal, was killed but the fort did not fall. The Maharana left Chitor with a Gallant army estimated around 80,000 to 100,000 Rajputs and arrived at the village of Nandsa, 12 kos ( ~ 24 miles) from Mandsaur.
In the meantime, Sultan Mahmud Khilji  of Malwa arrived from Mandu to assist the Gujarat forces to repay the debt he owed to Muzaffar Shah II. The siege was pressed but no progress made. Sanga was joined  by his trusted Vassals Medini Rai (then ruler of Malwa) and Raja Silhadi, the Tomar Rajput Chief of Raisen and Sarangpur with 15,000 Rajput forces each . The Mirati Sikandari says that "all the Rajas of the country round, went to the support of the Rana. Thus on both sides enormous forces were assembled. But the enterprise of Malik Ayaz did not advance in consequence of the ill-feeling entertained against him by the Amirs No progress was made in the siege of the fort."

Aftermath
Malik Ayaz foreseeing the ruin of his forces in the prolongation of the struggle made peace and fell back on Khiljipur, and eventually retreated to Gujarat. The Sultan is said to have received Malik Ayaz coldly when the latter waited on him at Chapaneri. The Mirati Sikandari says that not only was the Sultan very cold to Ayaz, but that all the people of Gujarat called him a coward.

References

Bibliography

History of Rajasthan
Mandsaur
Mandsaur